Kodu Game Lab, originally named Boku, is a programming integrated development environment (IDE) by Microsoft's FUSE Labs. It runs on Xbox 360 and Microsoft Windows XP, Windows Vista, Windows 7, Windows 8, Windows 10 And Windows 11. It was released on the Xbox Live Marketplace on June 30, 2009. A Windows version is available to the general public for download from Microsoft's FUSE web portal.

Overview
Kodu is a visual programming tool which is used to teach basic coding with the use of blocks and pictures. Its design allows it to be accessed by anyone.

Kodu is available to download as an Xbox One Indie Game.  There is also a PC version in an open beta which is available to anyone at their website.

Kodu is different from those other projects in several key ways:
 It avoids typing code by having users construct programs using visual elements via a game controller
 Rather than a bitmapped or 2D display, programs are executed in a 3D simulation environment, similar to Alice

Kodu Game Lab has also been used as an educational learning tool in selected schools and learning centers.

Language design
Kodu's programming model is simplified and can be programmed using a gaming controller or a combination of the keyboard and mouse. It dispenses with most "serious" programming conventions, including symbolic variables, branching, loops, number and string manipulation, subroutines, polymorphism, and so on.

This simplicity is achieved by situating the programming task in a largely complete simulation environment. The user programs the behaviors of characters in a 3d world, and programs are expressed in a high-level, sensory paradigm consisting of a rule-based system or language, based on conditions and actions similarly to AgentSheets.

The typical "hello world" of Kodu is:

see - fruit - move - towards

The grammar, as it were, of this expression is:

<condition> <action>

Where <condition> is:
<sensor> [<filter> ...]

And <action> is:
<verb> [<modifier> ...]

An illustrative variant of the above program is:
see - red - fruit - move - towards - quickly

Many different types of games can be made in Kodu Game Lab, such as racing, strategy, RPGs, adventure, platform, puzzle, 1st person shooters, and others.

See also
 Educational programming language
 Visual programming language

References

The Age (Australia): "Get With the Program"
Information Week: Microsoft Research Provides Sneak Preview Of 'Kodu' Programming Environment For Kids
Wired: TechFest Demo: Kodu
Seed Magazine on Kodu
Slate Magazine: Logo on Steroids
Edge Magazine: Do You Kodu?

External links
Kodu - Microsoft Research

Educational programming languages
Software for children
Microsoft Research
Pedagogic integrated development environments
Video game development software
2009 software